Katharine Burr Blodgett (January 10, 1898 – October 12, 1979) was an American physicist and chemist known for her work on surface chemistry, in particular her invention of "invisible" or nonreflective glass while working at General Electric. She was the first woman to be awarded a PhD in physics from the University of Cambridge, in 1926.

Early life
Blodgett was born on January 10, 1898, in Schenectady, New York. She was the second child of Katharine Buchanan (Burr) and George Reddington Blodgett. Her father was a patent attorney at General Electric where he headed that department. He was shot and killed in his home by a burglar just before she was born. GE offered a $5,000 reward for the arrest and conviction of the killer, but the suspected killer hanged himself in his jail cell in Salem, New York. Her mother was financially secure after her husband's death, and she moved to New York City with Katharine and her son George Jr. shortly after Katharine's birth.

In 1901, Katharine's mother moved the family to France so that the children would be bilingual. They lived there for several years, returned to New York for a year, during which time Katharine attended school in Saranac Lake, then spent time traveling through Germany. In 1912, Blodgett returned to New York City with her family and attended New York City's Rayson School.

Education
Blodgett's early childhood was split between New York and Europe, and she wasn't enrolled in school until she was eight years old. After attending Rayson School in New York City, she entered Bryn Mawr College on a scholarship, where she was inspired by two professors in particular: mathematician Charlotte Angas Scott and physicist James Barnes.

In 1917, Irving Langmuir, a former colleague of her father and future Nobel Prize laureate, took Katharine on a tour of General Electric (GE)'s research laboratories. He offered her a research position at GE if she first completed higher education, so she enrolled in a master's degree program at the University of Chicago after receiving her bachelor's degree.

At the University of Chicago she studied gas adsorption with Harvey B. Lemon, researching the chemical structure of gas masks. She graduated in 1918 and took a research scientist position working with Langmuir. After six years at the company, Blodgett decided to pursue a doctoral degree with hopes of advancing further within GE. Langmuir arranged for her to study physics at Cambridge University, at the Cavendish Laboratory persuading somewhat reluctant administrators to offer one of their few positions to a woman. She was enrolled at Newnham College, matriculating in 1924. She studied with Sir Ernest Rutherford and in 1926 became the first woman to receive a PhD in physics from Cambridge University.

Work at General Electric
Blodgett was hired by General Electric as a research scientist in 1918 after receiving a master's degree from the University of Chicago. She was the first woman to work as a scientist for General Electric Laboratory in Schenectady, NY. She often worked with Irving Langmuir, who had pioneered a technique for creating single-molecule thin films on the surface of water. Blodgett and Langmuir explored the application of similar techniques to lipids, polymers, and proteins, creating monomolecular coatings designed to cover surfaces of water, metal, or glass. These special coatings were oily and could be deposited in layers only a few nanometers thick.

In 1935, Blodgett extended Langmuir's work by devising a method to spread monomolecular coatings one at a time onto glass or metal. By repeatedly dipping a metal plate into water covered by a layer of oil, she was able to stack oil layers onto the plate with molecular precision.  The apparatus which she used and refined is known as the Langmuir–Blodgett trough.

Using this technique, Blodgett developed practical uses for Langmuir's gossamer films.  Blodgett used a barium stearate film to cover glass with 44 monomolecular layers, making the glass more than 99% transmissive and creating "invisible" glass.  The visible light reflected by the layers of film canceled the reflections created by the glass. This type of nonreflective coating is now called  Langmuir–Blodgett film and is widely used. The first major cinematic production to use Blodgett's invisible glass was the popular film Gone with the Wind (1939), noted for its crystal-clear cinematography. Once introduced, nonreflective lenses were used for projectors and cameras by the post-war movie industry. Blodgett's glass was also used for  submarine periscopes and airplane spy cameras during World War II.

Blodgett also invented the color gauge, a method to measure the molecular coatings on the glass to one millionth of an inch.  The gauge employs the concept that different thicknesses of coatings are different colors. While examining the layering of stearic acid on a glass plate, she realized that the addition of each layer, about 2/10,000,000 inch thick, reliably changed the color of the plate.  Before her invention, the best measurement instruments were only accurate to a few thousandths of an inch. Her glass "ruler" much more precisely showed the progression of colors and their corresponding thicknesses.  Measuring thickness became as simple as matching colors.

Blodgett and Langmuir also worked on improvements to the light bulb. Their studies on electrical discharges in gases helped lay the foundations for plasma physics.

Blodgett was issued eight U.S. patents during her career. She was the sole inventor on all but two of the patents, working with Vincent J. Schaefer as co-inventor. Blodgett published over 30 technical papers in various scientific journals and was the inventor of poison gas adsorbents, methods for deicing aircraft wings, and improving smokescreens.

Personal life
Blodgett never married and lived a vibrant life, living in a Boston marriage for many years with Gertrude Brown, who came from an old Schenectady family. For another period she also lived with Elsie Errington, the English-born director of a nearby girls' school. "The household arrangement freed Blodgett from most domestic responsibilities—except for making her famous applesauce and popovers." Unfortunately, she did not leave any personal papers with her thoughts about her long-term relationships with these women.

Blodgett's niece and namesake was astrophysicist and civil servant Katharine Blodgett Gebbie. In an autobiographical memoir, Gebbie recalled that on family visits her Aunt Blodgett:

"always arrived with suitcases full of 'apparatus', with which she showed us such wonders as how to make colors by dipping glass rods into thin films of oil floating on water."

Gebbie often spoke in later life of her aunt's influence by personal example on her choice of a career in science.

Blodgett bought a home in Schenectady overlooking her birthplace where she spent most of her adult life. She was an actress in her town's theater group and volunteered for civic and charitable organizations. Blodgett was the treasurer of the Traveler's Aid Society there. She spent summers at a camp at Lake George in upstate New York, to pursue her love of gardening. Blodgett was also an avid amateur astronomer; she collected antiques, played bridge with friends  and wrote funny poems in her spare time. She died in her home on October 12, 1979.

Awards
Blodgett received numerous awards during her lifetime. She received a star in the seventh edition of American Men of Science (1943), recognizing her as one of the 1,000 most distinguished scientists in the United States. In 1945, the American Association of University Women honored her with its Annual Achievement Award.

In 1951 she received the prestigious Francis Garvan Medal from the American Chemical Society for her work on monomolecular films.  That same year, she was chosen by the U.S. Chamber of Commerce as one of 15 "women of achievement." Also in 1951, she was honored in Boston's First Assembly of American Women in Achievement (the only scientist in the group) and the mayor of Schenectady honored her with Katharine Blodgett Day on June 13, 1951, because of all the honor she had brought to her community.

In 1972, the Photographic Society of America presented her with its Annual Achievement Award and in 2007 she was inducted into the National Inventors Hall of Fame. In 2008 an elementary school in Schenectady was opened bearing her name.

She received honorary doctorates from Elmira College (1939), Western College (1942), Brown University (1942), and Russell Sage College (1944).

Patents

 issued November 5, 1940: "Film Structure and Method of Preparation"
 issued November 5, 1940: "Reduction of Surface Reflection"
 issued November 5, 1940: "Low-Reflectance Glass"
 issued January 10, 1950: "Electrical Indicator of Mechanical Expansion" (with Vincent J. Schaefer)
 issued February 26, 1952: "Step Gauge for Measuring Thickness of Thin Films"
 issued March 18, 1952: "Electrical Indicator of Mechanical Expansion" (with Vincent J. Schaefer)
 issued May 20, 1952: "Electrically Conducting Layer"
 issued April 28, 1953: "Method of Forming Semiconducting Layers on Glass and Article Formed Thereby"

See also
Notable American Women by the Radcliffe Institute, Harvard University

References

Further reading

1898 births
1979 deaths
American women physicists
Women inventors
Recipients of the Garvan–Olin Medal
American women chemists
American women in World War I
Bryn Mawr College alumni
Alumni of the University of Cambridge
University of Chicago alumni
20th-century American physicists
20th-century American women scientists
20th-century American inventors
Fellows of the American Physical Society